Taylor Corner is an unincorporated community in DeKalb County, Indiana, in the United States.

History
A post office was established at Taylor Corner in 1850, and remained in operation until it was discontinued in 1863. Members of the Taylor family served as early postmasters.

References

Unincorporated communities in DeKalb County, Indiana
Unincorporated communities in Indiana